División del Norte is a metro station along Line 3 of the Mexico City Metro. It is located in the Benito Juárez borough of Mexico City.

General information
The station logo represents Revolutionary hero Pancho Villa, leader of the División del Norte of revolutionary soldiers during the Mexican Revolution of 1910. Its name is taken from the nearby Avenida División del Norte.  The station has a cultural display.  The station opened on 25 August 1980.

Until trolleybus service was discontinued on line "O" in 2010,  this metro station was served by trolleybus line "O", which runs between Metro Mixcoac and the Central de Abasto wholesale market.

División del Norte serves Del Valle, Letrán Valle, Vertiz Narvarte and Santa Cruz Atoyac neighborhoods. It is located in the crossing between Avenida Universidad, Avenida División del Norte and Avenida Cuauhtemoc, in what used to be "Glorieta del Riviera".

On 16 February 1994, Cuban Mexican vedette Judith Velasco killed herself in this station by jumping to the tracks dying instantly when she was hit by the train.

Ridership

Nearby
Parque de las Arboledas, public park.
Parroquia de la Medalla Milagrosa, church designed by Félix Candela.

Exits
Northeast: Av. División del Norte and Matías Romero street, Letrán Valle
Southeast: Av. División del Norte and Chichen Itzá street, Letrán Valle
South: Av. Cuauhtémoc and Av. Universidad, Santa Cruz Atoyac
Northwest: Av. División del Norte, Santa Cruz Atoyac
Southwest: Matías Romero street, Colonia del Valle

References

External links 

Division del Norte
Railway stations opened in 1980
1980 establishments in Mexico
Mexico City Metro stations in Benito Juárez, Mexico City